Myiotrixa is a genus of tachinid flies in the family Tachinidae from Western Australia.

Species
M. prosopina Brauer & Bergenstamm, 1893

References

Tachininae
Diptera of Australasia
Tachinidae genera